Manchester Ink Link is an online publisher for local news, events and happenings in the greater Manchester, New Hampshire area. The publisher is a member of the New Hampshire Press Association.

References

External links
 Manchester Ink Link

Hillsborough County, New Hampshire
Manchester, New Hampshire
Newspapers published in New Hampshire
Publications established in 2014